Tongatapu 3 is an electoral constituency for the Legislative Assembly in the Kingdom of Tonga. It was established for the November 2010 general election, when the multi-seat regional constituencies for People's Representatives were replaced by single-seat constituencies, electing one representative via the first past the post electoral system. Located on the country's main island, Tongatapu, it encompasses parts of Kolofoʻou and Maʻufanga (districts of the capital city Nukuʻalofa), and the entirety of the villages of Pahu, ʻAmaile, Fasi-moe-afi-ʻa-Tungi, Ngeleʻia, Mataika, and Halaleva.

Its first ever representative is Sitiveni Halapua, of the Democratic Party of the Friendly Islands. Halapua, a first time MP, defeated Clive Edwards, an incumbent MP and former Deputy Prime Minister. (Edwards was nonetheless subsequently appointed Minister for Justice, thus obtaining a seat in Parliament ex officio.) For the 2014 election, Halapua was deselected by the party, which endorsed Simote Vea as its candidate to replace him. Vea was defeated by independent candidate Siaosi Sovaleni, resulting in the DPFI losing the seat.

Members of Parliament

Election results

2014

2010

References

Tongan legislative constituencies
Tongatapu
2010 establishments in Tonga
Constituencies established in 2010